Agilfride (8th-century13 December 787) was a Roman Catholic bishop, who was an associate of Charlemagne and served as the Bishop of Liège from 769 until his death in 787.

Biography 
Agilfride was born in the early 8th-century into a noble Frankish family, and has been said to be a relative of Charlemagne. Due to no clarification of how Agilfride was related to him, historians suggest that he was related through one of his wives. Agilfride served as an abbot of Saint-Amand Abbey and Saint Bavo's Abbey prior to his ascension to bishop, and is assumed to have retained the title of abbot during his episcopate. Sometime in 754, Agilfride, while returning from Rome, acquired and brought the relics of Pharaildis and Bavo of Ghent from Lotharingia to Saint Bavo's Abbey, where they remain present to this day.

Agilfride was said to be well respected at the courtyard of Charlemagne, who granted him several franchises and considerable assets in favor of his church, and appointed Agilfride as Bishop of Liège in 769, replacing the previously deceased Fulcaire. Charlemange also visited the Diocese of Liège on multiple occasions, celebrating Easter. According to the Annales Laubacenses, in 774, Agilfride was entrusted by Charlemagne to handle the detention of Desiderius and his wife Ansa.

It has recently been suggested, that Agilfride sanctified the first church in Osnabrück sometime from 783 to 787, which was a wooden church and served as the seat for the Diocese of Osnabrück at the time of establishment.

Agilfride died on 13 December 787 and was succeeded by Gerbald.

Notes

References

Works cited 

 
 
 
 
 
 
 
 
 
 
 
 

8th-century births
787 deaths
8th-century bishops
8th-century Frankish bishops
Belgian Roman Catholic bishops